Asani Matora (born 19 December 1976) is a retired Zimbabwean football defender.

References

1976 births
Living people
Zimbabwean footballers
Zimbabwe international footballers
CAPS United players
Association football defenders